The Bucherer carbazole synthesis is a chemical reaction used to synthesize carbazoles from naphthols and aryl hydrazines using sodium bisulfite. The reaction is named after Hans Theodor Bucherer.

See also
Borsche-Drechsel cyclization
Bucherer reaction

References

Nitrogen heterocycle forming reactions
Heterocycle forming reactions

Name reactions